There has been auto racing in Illinois for almost as long as there have been automobiles.  Almost every type of motorsport found in the United States can be found in Illinois. Both modern and historic tracks exist in Illinois, including NASCAR's Chicagoland Speedway and Gateway International Speedway. Notable drivers from Illinois include Danica Patrick, Tony Bettenhausen, and Fred Lorenzen.

Types of auto racing

Stock car racing
National stock car racing touring series (such as NASCAR Monster Energy Cup, ARCA, NASCAR Nationwide Series, and Craftsman Truck Series) race mainly on 4 tracks in Illinois: Chicagoland Speedway, near Chicago, Gateway International Speedway, Near St. Louis, and the mile dirt tracks at the Illinois State Fairgrounds, and the DuQuoin State Fairgrounds near DuQuoin, Illinois.

Asphalt stock car racing is more prevalent in the northern part of Illinois with such tracks as Rockford Speedway or Grundy County Speedway. These tracks hold weekly racing programs, with Rockford's racing sanctioned by NASCAR's Weekly Racing Series. Regional to nationally known touring series, such as ARTGO and Mid American Stock Car Series have held special events these at both of these tracks.

Drag racing
Drag racing is fairly popular throughout Illinois, with both 1/4 and 1/8 mile tracks being found in the state.  There are several National points events held in Illinois, as well as local weekly drag racing.

Off-road racing
Off-road racing can be found at temporary tracks at Route 66 Raceway to the permanent facilities at Lincoln Trail Motorsports Park.

Motorcycle racing
Motorcycle racing is held on permanent road-courses in northern Illinois, as well as motocross and hill climbs throughout the state.  One of the most well-known motorcycle races in the U.S. can be found at the Illinois State Fairgrounds  oval track.

Sports car racing
Several tracks host sports car racing in Illinois, although it is not prevalent with few road courses such as Blackhawk Farms Raceway.

Dirt oval racing

Dirt track racing on oval circuits is probably one of the most prevalent forms of motorsports in Illinois.  Track sizes vary from the short and tight 1/5 mile Macon Speedway to the  ovals at Springfield and DuQuoin. The Illini Racing Series (IRS) races midget and dwarf cars at various tracks in northern Illinois plus Angell Park Speedway in Wisconsin.

Karting
Kart racing can be found throughout Illinois on both dirt and asphalt.

Notable tracks

Springfield Mile, Springfield

The one mile (1.6 km) dirt Illinois State Fairgrounds Racetrack in Springfield has had a long and varied past. Since before the inception of USAC, there have been Midgets, Sprints, and Silver Crown races at the "Monster Mile."  The first incarnation of the track ran east–west. It now is raced north–south orientation.  The Allen Crowe Memorial 100, named in honor of the Springfield resident, is held there every year during the Illinois State Fair.  The race originated following the popular driver's death in 1963.  USAC's Stock Car division sanctioned the race from 1963, until they ceased operations in 1984.  The 1983 and 1984 races were co-sanctioned between ARCA and USAC.  ARCA now sanctions this popular race.  Until recently, the mile has hosted the United Midwestern Promoters UMP Fall Nationals for UMP Late Models. In the past, the mile has also hosted races sanctioned by the World of Outlaws. Many. many notable names have raced and won here, including Mario Andretti, A. J. Foyt, Davey Allison, and Benny Parsons.  The "Monster Mile" also hosts some of the most well-known flat track motorcycle races in the U.S.  The AMA sanctioned races are held every May and September, and draw motorcycle enthusiasts from all over the country.

Chicagoland Speedway, Joliet

Chicagoland Speedway is Illinois' only Superspeedway.  It hosts races for NASCAR, ARCA, and IndyCar on its 1½ mile tri-oval.  Chicagoland Speedway is the sister track to Route 66 Raceway, which boasts a 1/4-mile NHRA sanctioned dragstrip as well as a 1/2-mile dirt oval that has hosted World of Outlaws Late Models, Team Demolition Derbies, and off-road races sanctioned by CORR (at the time SODA).

Gateway International Raceway, Madison

Gateway International Raceway, located across the Mississippi River from St. Louis, Missouri, is another of Illinois' largest tracks.  It host races sanctioned by NASCAR, INDYCAR, USAC, and NHRA.  Gateway's configuration is unique in the turns 3 & 4 have a larger radius than turns 1 & 2.  It has been likened to NASCAR's Darlington Raceway.  At 1¼ miles, it is just shorter than Darlington. The facility has a 1/4-mile NHRA sanctioned dragstrip.

Macon Speedway, Macon

One of the shortest tracks in Illinois, the 1/5-mile Macon Speedway has played host to some of most famous names in motorsports.  Created in 1946, it is also one of the oldest continuous operating speedways in Illinois.  Built on an old brick factory, it was known for years as "The Other Brickyard," in reference to the Indianapolis Motor Speedway being known as "The Brickyard."  Macon Speedway was owned and operated by the Webb family for many years, but has changed hands many times in the last 20 years.  The Current owners are NASCAR stars Ken Schrader, Kenny Wallace, Tony Stewart, and local promoter Bob Sargent.

Notable defunct tracks

Soldier Field, Chicago, Illinois

Soldier Field was the site of numerous races. A 1/4 mile board track was built, and the first two midget car races at the track in 1939 were won by Sam Hanks. The track was also used for motorcycle races. The board track was removed and it was changed to a half-mile dirt oval track. In 1956, NASCAR swung through for its only race at Soldier Field. Twenty-five cars started the 200-lapper, with Fireball Roberts averaging  to win $850. The racetrack was torn out in 1970.

O'Hare Stadium, Schiller Park, Illinois
O’Hare Stadium, part of the Chicagoland racing scene for 12 years, was located just southwest of the corner of Mannheim and Irving Park Road in Schiller Park. The speedway, which operated between 1956 through 1968, was initially surrounded by farm fields and was situated just south of Chicago's famed O’Hare International Airport. NASCAR sanctioned the late model racing at O’Hare in 1960 and 1961. With property values rising, the track, which also featured cadet (sportsman), figure eight, Volkswagen and midget racing over the years, was demolished weeks after the final race program on September 7, 1968.

Joe Shaheen's Springfield Speedway, Springfield, Illinois

Not to be confused with the mile track in Springfield, this now-defunct track was famous in the racing world as "the place to go race after the fair."  Many famous and notable race drivers would run the USAC races at the fairgrounds, then trek across town to Shaheen's track to do more battle. Its configuration changed a few times over the years, with its final configuration being a 3/8 mile clay oval.

Santa Fe Speedway, Willow Springs, Illinois

This track, southwest of Chicago, was home to many of Chicagoland's drivers.  Originally built for horses, cars took over as the main attraction in the 1920s.  Later that same decade, a tornado took out the original grandstands, and the track was closed.  After World War II, two new tracks were built on the site.  One was a 7/16-mile oval, the other a 1/4 mile oval.  This configuration was operational from 1953, until the site was sold for development in 1995.  On July 10, 1954, NASCAR's Grand National Division (now known as the NASCAR Cup Series) made a stop at Santa Fe Speedway for a 200 lap race.  The race was won by #3, Dick Rathman, in a 1954 Hudson Hornet.  Over the years many famous names have raced there, including Benny Parsons, Cale Yarborough, David Pearson, Buddy Baker, Kyle Petty, Kenny Roberts, Ramo Stott and Tony Stewart.

Today, the site of this former track is home to a relatively upscale multi-family housing complex just south of 91st street in Burr Ridge, IL.

Meadowdale International Raceway
Meadowdale International Raceway was a road course located near Carpentersville, Illinois. It was used for motor racing from 1958 to 1968. Sanctioning bodies complained about its safety. It closed in 1968 in part from competition from other road courses in the regional (Road America and Blackhawk Farms Raceway).

List of notable Illinois race car drivers
This is a list of race car drivers from Illinois that have raced in a major touring series, and have held a full-time position there.  These series include NASCAR's Sprint Cup Series, NCTS, and Nationwide series, USAC Indy Cars, the IRL or Champ Car Series, ARCA, or one of the major off-road racing sanctioning bodies.

Other drivers include "Chicago Gang" midget car racing drivers Emil Andres and Jimmy Snyder (who won the pole position for the 1939 Indianapolis 500). Chicago-born Billy Arnold won the 1930 Indy 500. Another driver from Illinois was Shorty Cantlon, who was killed during the 1947 Indianapolis 500 in his 11th appearance in that race. Chicago-born Louis Disbrow competed in four Indy 500s.

Other notable racing figures

Tracks in Illinois

Asphalt Oval

Dirt Oval

Drag Strips

Road Courses

Motocross Tracks

References